Omer Shapira (born 9 September 1994) is an Israeli racing cyclist, who rides for UCI Women's WorldTeam . She is an eight-time national road champion; winning the Israeli National Time Trial Championships in 2020 and 2022, and the Israeli National Road Race Championships for six consecutive years between 2017 and 2022.

Career
Shapira rode in the women's time trial event at the 2018 UCI Road World Championships.

Canyon–SRAM (2019–21)
For the 2019 season, Shapira joined the  team.

In March, she came in second at the Scorpions' Pass Time Trial and third at the Aphrodite Cycling Race Individual Time Trial, and in August, she came in third overall at the Colorado Classic. In September, Shapira finished 13th of 53 cyclists in the  time trial at the UCI Road World Championships in Great Britain.

In doing so, she guaranteed Israel a place at the women's time trial contest in the 2020 Summer Olympics. Ultimately delayed to 2021 due to the COVID-19 pandemic, Shapira represented Israel in both the time trial and the road race. In the road race, Shapira was in a pack at the front for most of the race only to be overhauled by the chasing pack in the final moments; she finished in 24th place. In the time trial, Shapira finished in 15th place.

EF Education–Tibco–SVB
In her first season with the team, she won both Israeli national road championship titles – her second in the time trial, and her sixth consecutive title in the road race.

Personal life
Shapira grew up in moshav Ein HaBesor, Israel. She is in a relationship with Israeli cyclist Guy Sagiv. They reside in Girona, Spain.

Major results

Source: 

2014
 3rd Road race, National Road Championships
2015
 2nd Road race, National Road Championships
2016
 National Road Championships
3rd Time trial
3rd Road race
 4th Massada–Arad
 4th Arad–Dimona–Arad
 4th Dead Sea–Scorpion Pass
2017
 1st  Road race, National Road Championships
 8th Giro del Trentino Alto Adige-Südtirol
2018
 National Road Championships
1st  Road race
2nd Time trial
 7th Overall Gracia–Orlová
 10th Overall Tour of Eftalia Hotels & Velo Alanya
2019
 1st  Road race, National Road Championships
 1st Stage 1 (TTT) Giro Rosa
 2nd Scorpions' Pass Time Trial
 3rd Overall Colorado Classic
 3rd Aphrodite Cycling Race Individual Time Trial
 4th Tour of Arava
 5th Aphrodite's Sanctuary Cycling Race
 8th Overall Tour of California
 9th Overall Giro della Toscana Int. Femminile – Memorial Michela Fanini
2020
 National Road Championships
1st  Road race
1st  Time trial
 1st  Cross-country marathon, National Mountain Bike Championships
2021
 1st  Road race, National Road Championships
 10th Overall Setmana Ciclista Valenciana
 10th Overall Giro della Toscana Int. Femminile – Memorial Michela Fanini
2022
 National Road Championships
1st  Road race
1st  Time trial

References

External links
 
 
 
 
 
 Omer Shapira at FirstCycling.com
 
 
 
 

1994 births
Living people
Israeli female cyclists
Place of birth missing (living people)
European Games competitors for Israel
Cyclists at the 2019 European Games
Olympic cyclists of Israel
Cyclists at the 2020 Summer Olympics